Sir John Frederick Drughorn, 1st Baronet (1 August 1862 – 23 February 1943) was a Dutch-born English shipowner and benefactor.

Drughorn was born Jean Frederic Drughorn in Amsterdam, as the oldest son of the shipping agent Johannes Jacobus Drughorn (1839–1967) and Frederica Christina Kessler, both from Amsterdam. At the age of 20, already in charge of his father's business, he married Roosje Moses Piller (1863, Purmerend – 1943, Sobibor). The couple had three children in Amsterdam but divorced in 1908.

Drughorn was a director of Fred Drughorn, Ltd, the Anglo-Brazilian Line, Ltd, and the British and Continental Estates, Ltd. In 1915, he was convicted of trading with the enemy. Despite that history, in 1922 he successfully purchased a baronetcy (of Ifield Hall in the County of Sussex) from Maundy Gregory as part of the Lloyd George honours scandal. He married Elizabeth Berlips, daughter of Lewis Berlips, in 1883. He died in February 1943, aged eighty. He had a surviving daughter, but no surviving sons and the baronetcy died with him.

References

1862 births
1943 deaths
Baronets in the Baronetage of the United Kingdom
Businesspeople from Amsterdam
Dutch businesspeople in shipping
Dutch emigrants to England
English businesspeople in shipping
Naturalised citizens of the United Kingdom